Angry Indian Goddesses is a 2015 Indian Hindi-language drama film directed by Pan Nalin and produced by Gaurav Dhingra and Pan Nalin under the banner Jungle Book Entertainment. It stars Sandhya Mridul, Tannishtha Chatterjee, Sarah-Jane Dias, Anushka Manchanda, Amrit Maghera, Rajshri Deshpande, and Pavleen Gujral with Adil Hussain. It was screened in the Special Presentations section of the 2015 Toronto International Film Festival, where it finished second for the People's Choice Award.

Plot
Freida is a fashion photographer who invites a group of friends to her family's home to announce her marriage. The group consists of Madhurita or Mad, a Bollywood singer, Pamela Jaswal or Pammy, a trophy wife, Suranjana or Su, a businesswoman, and Joanna or Jo, an aspiring actress. Nargis, an activist, later joins the party. The announcement sets off a chain of reactions, letting out hidden secrets from all of the girls. Freida explains that her father will not join her for the wedding, and Mad's boyfriend, who comes looking for her, explains that she is depressed and suicidal. After the announcement, the girls from all over India descends upon Goa. Thus begins an impromptu bachelorette party, and the girls begin to bond.

Everything's set for a night of celebration. There's only one issue: Frieda won't say who her betrothed is. As they banter their way through celebration, their conversation, derived entirely from improvisations among the actors, covers everything from sex to street harassment to the buff (and often shirtless) next-door neighbour.

During the trip, the women are harassed and they react boldly. Their harassers are enraged and they are shaken.  As the holiday progresses, we become acquainted with the women's dreams, desires, fears and, above all, their unwavering bond with one another.

Later, the ladies learn that Freida will marry Nargis (which was illegal under the IPC section 377 until 6 September 2018). A night before the marriage, the group decides to have a picnic on the beach. At the picnic, a heated argument between Jo and the rest of the group regarding her accent leads Jo to walk out, but the party continues till late in the night. When they decide to go home, they look about for Jo. She is found dead on the beach, apparently raped. The doctor, who arrives in the ambulance, refuses to remove her before the police come as she is already dead. The police reach shortly and the police officer in charge conducts his preliminary inquiries in a manner that shames the women, reiterating their lack of faith in a patriarchal society that treats women shabbily. They return home, distraught and frustrated.

Su's daughter Maya had followed Jo when she left the party and took photos of her subsequently. The pictures reveal that it is the group of men who had harassed the friends earlier that raped and killed Jo. Su heads back to the beach with a gun. The rest of the group chases after her. Su shoots 3 of the rapists before Nargis stops her, Mad takes the gun and kills the other two.
At Jo's funeral, the group makes a series of sentimental speeches, Nargis' speech summarizing the worth of a woman and hopes that in the next lives of women, they would be able to write their own stories. The police officer interrupts the ceremony, asking for a confession of guilt from the women and wanting them to stand up. The story has an open-ended conclusion with the entire congregation in the church standing up in solidarity with the women.

Cast
Sarah-Jane Dias as Freida De Silva, a fashion photographer and the bride
Tannishtha Chatterjee as Nargis Nasreen, a revolutionary who is adversaries with Su
Anushka Manchanda as  Madhurita aka "Mad", a Bollywood singer and friend of Freida
Sandhya Mridul as Suranjana aka "Su", a businesswoman and mother of 6-year-old Maya
Amrit Maghera as Joanna Mendes aka "Jo", an aspiring actress and cousin of Freida
Rajshri Deshpande as Lakshmi, Freida's maid
Pavleen Gujral as Pamela Jaiswal aka 'Pammy', a gold medalist turned housewife
Arjun Mathur as Zain, Madhurita's boyfriend
Adil Hussain as a Goa Police Superintendent
Jeffrey Goldberg as Chris 
Vikram Kochhar as an agent 
Anuj Choudhary as the neighbor.
Rajesh Karekar as Tony
Dr. Swapnil Salkar as the doctor
Kkunal Shinde as a voice over artist.

Soundtrack
The film's music was composed by Cyril Morin and produced by Super Cassettes Industries Limited. Song lyrics were written by Raman Negi, Anushka Manchanda, and Dr. Swapnil Salkar.

Title sequence
The film's opening title sequence was designed by Plexus, a Mumbai-based VFX and animation studio. The title sequence was named by Artofthetitle.com as one of the top ten title sequences of 2015. The studio's founders and motion graphics artists Vijesh Rajan and Yashoda Parthasarthy were also interviewed by the Artofthetitle.com staff about their process for designing the title sequence. The title sequence was asked to be censored and blurred in its entirety by the Central Board of Film Certification (CBFC) for its Indian release.

Release
The film was released in two versions: an international version, and an Indian version. The international version which was screened at the Toronto International Film Festival is not censored and does not have an interval, unlike the Indian version.

Reception
On review aggregator website Rotten Tomatoes, the film has an approval rating of 61% based on 18 critics, with an average rating of 5.9/10.

Namrata Joshi of The Hindu wrote "Pavleen Gujral is a revelation and Sarah-Jane Dias shows admirable poise".

Mohar Basu of The Times of Indiasaid "Alas, the story is never supported by a solid screenplay. The film's pace is a problem and though things gear up in the second half, it ends as a loopy mess".

Sweta Kaushal of Hindustan Times was of a different opinion, she stated "Ultimately, Angry Indian Goddesses is a decent watch as long as the fun lasts but tumbles downhill with gathering pace as the 'anger' kicks in".

In the West the film was poorly received by critics. Varietys Jay Weissberg criticized the director Pan Nalin for "overload[ing] his jaunty wagon with weighty of-the-moment topics that it splinters into dozens of pieces".

Justin Lowe of The Hollywood Reporter was of the same view, he wrote that "[the film's] emphasis on the women's reactions to a variety of discriminatory situations starts to resemble a checklist approach, ticking off situations that cover career challenges, marriage dilemmas and personal relationships".

However, Linda Barnard of the Toronto Star who gave the film a score 2.5 out of 4 stars, called the actresses "Goddesses" who are "crowd pleasers".

Also enjoying the film was Kate Taylor of The Globe and Mail who didn't hesitate to write "It works, partly because the Indian cinema, accustomed to epics encompassing musical, comedy and tragedy, has a sprawling sensibility and partly because the script, for all its sunshine and sentiment, has actually built to its startling conclusion".

References

External links

2010s Hindi-language films
2010s female buddy films
2015 comedy-drama films
2015 LGBT-related films
Indian female buddy films
Indian feminist films
Films about rape in India
Films about women in India
Films set in Goa
Indian buddy comedy-drama films
Indian LGBT-related films
LGBT-related comedy-drama films
Same-sex marriage in film
2015 comedy films
Hindi-language drama films
Films directed by Pan Nalin